The  was a Japanese lunisolar calendar (genka reki). It was also known as Hōryaku Kōjutsu Gen-reki.  It was published in 1755.

History
The  Hōryaku Kōjutsu Genreki system was the work of Abe Yasukuni, Shibukawa Kōkyō, and Nishiyama Seikyū.  Errors in the calendar were corrected in 1798 and in 1844.  In 1872, the Western calendar was adopted.

See also
 Japanese calendar
 Sexagenary cycle
 Hōreki

References

External links
 National Diet Library, "The Japanese Calendar"

Specific calendars
History of science and technology in Japan
Time in Japan